100 Days to Heaven is a 2011 Philippine fantasy comedy drama television series directed by Malu L. Sevilla, Jojo A. Saguin, and Don M. Cuaresma. The series stars Coney Reyes and Xyriel Manabat as Anna Manalastas, and Jodi Sta. Maria as Sophia Delgado and Trisha Manalastas, with an ensemble cast consisting of Joel Torre, Dominic Ochoa, Smokey Manaloto, Valerie Concepcion, Rafael Rosell, Jewel Mische, Emmanuelle Vera, Neil Coleta, Louise Abuel, Rustica Carpio, and Noel Trinidad in their supporting roles. The series originally aired on ABS-CBN's Primetime Bida evening block and worldwide on TFC from May 9 to November 18, 2011, with a total of 140 episodes, replacing Mutya.

Due to the quarantine caused by the COVID-19 pandemic in the Philippines, the series returned to air from March 16, 2020, until the cease and desist order, temporarily replacing Pamilya Ko.

Series overview

Episodes

2011

References

External links

Lists of children's television series episodes
Lists of Philippine drama television series episodes
2010s television-related lists